Ignace Iamak (born 23 March 1990) is a Vanuatuan footballer who plays as a defender for Nalkutan in the Port Vila Football League.

References

1990 births
Living people
Vanuatuan footballers
Association football defenders
Vanuatu international footballers
Tafea F.C. players
Nalkutan F.C. players
2016 OFC Nations Cup players